The Institute of International Relations (Turkmen: Halkara Gatnaşyklary Instituty; Russian: Институт международных отношений) is the diplomatic academy of Turkmenistan, which is considered the country's "national school of diplomacy."  It was formally created on March 20, 2008, by decree of Turkmenistan's President Gurbanguly Berdimuhamedow.

Curriculum

The institute includes four colleges ("faculties"): international relations, international law, international economic relations, and international journalism.  Subordinate to them are six departments: international relations and diplomacy, international and comparative law, international economic relations, theory and practice of journalism, world languages, and social sciences.

References

External links
Official Website (English)
Official Website (Turkmen)
Official Website (Russian)

2008 establishments in Turkmenistan
Education in Ashgabat
Educational institutions established in 2008
Schools of international relations
Universities in Turkmenistan